Sanhe is a town of southern Bishan District in western Chongqing Municipality, People's Republic of China, located  south-southwest of the county seat and about  southwest of Chongqing's CBD as the crow flies. , it has one residential community and seven villages under its administration.

References

Township-level divisions of Chongqing